Welby may refer to:

Entertainment
 Marcus Welby, M.D., a 1970s television series in the United States

Places
 Welby, New South Wales, Australia
 Welby, Lincolnshire, United Kingdom
 Welby, Colorado, US

People
 Welby baronets, created in 1801
 Sir Alfred Welby, English politician 
 Alfredo Welby, Italian professional footballer
 Amelia Welby (1819–1852), American poet
 Sir Christopher Welby-Everard, British Army officer
 Euphemia Welby, Women's Royal Naval Service officer
 Justin Welby (born 6 January 1956), Archbishop of Canterbury
 Norrie May-Welby, Scottish-Australian transgender social activist
 Piergiorgio Welby, muscular dystrophy sufferer, whose case stirred up a right-to-die debate in Italy
 Reginald Welby, 1st Baron Welby, British peer
 Siân Welby, English television presenter and radio host
 Thom Welby, American politician and broadcaster. 
 Thomas Welby, English missionary
 Thomas Welby (Irish politician)
 Victoria, Lady Welby, self-educated English philosopher of language